The desert dace (Eremichthys acros)  is a rare cyprinid fish known only from the warm springs and creeks of Soldier Meadow in western Humboldt County, Nevada, USA. It is the only member of the monotypic genus Eremichthys. The species is also notable for its ability to live in waters as warm as 38 °C (100 °F). It is the sole member of its genus Eremichthys.

A small species, not known over 7.7 cm in length, it is olive green above and silvery below, with vaguely mottled sides that flash with yellow reflections. There is some blackish spotting and a deep green streak along and above the lateral line. Dorsal and anal fins are usually eight-rayed.

It feeds on small invertebrates, mainly insects, and eats some algae.

The desert dace has been classified as vulnerable since 1996, due to the combination of limited distribution and adaptation to its unusual habitat. Threats include the introduction of goldfish and largemouth bass Micropterus salmoides into a reservoir connected to the springs, as well as the popularity of the warm springs for bathing.

References

USGS page on status of desert dace, with pictures
Fish & Wildlife Service species profile
UNR page on the desert dace

Desert dace
Desert dace
Fish of the Eastern United States
Freshwater fish of the United States
Fauna of the Great Basin
Desert dace
Desert dace
Desert dace
Fish described in 1948
ESA threatened species